

Surname
Josh Zeid (born 1987), Israeli-American Major League and Team Israel baseball pitcher
Mahmoud Abu Zeid (born c. 1987), Egyptian photojournalist

Other
 Princess Sarah Zeid of Jordan
 Ibrahim Zeid Keilani (1937–2013), Jordanian politician
 Zeid Mohamed, Egyptian technocrat
 Zeyd, Azerbaijan

See also
 Zeit (disambiguation)